is a Japanese romance josei manga series written and illustrated by George Asakura. It was published by Shodensha from 2003 to 2008 on Feel Young magazine. The first two volumes were published in French by Asuka. A spin-off was serialized from March 7 to June 8, 2015. A live action film adaptation directed by Tomorowo Taguchi was released on September 5, 2015, in Japan.

Characters
Shino Umemiya
Kyōshirō Sugahara
Akari Narita

Cast
Mikako Tabe
Gō Ayano
Tori Matsuzaka
Fumino Kimura
Kaoru Mitsumune
Tasuku Emoto
Masaki Suda
Tomoya Nakamura
Tamae Andō
Ryū Morioka
Kankurō Kudō
Ryūichi Hiroki
Kazunobu Mineta

Volumes
1 (May 8, 2004)
2 (May 20, 2005)
3 (July 7, 2006)
4 (March 8, 2007)
5 (February 7, 2009)

Reception
The film grossed  on its opening weekend and was number 10 at the box office.

References

External links
Official film website 

Live-action films based on manga
Josei manga
Manga adapted into films
Romance anime and manga
Shodensha franchises
Shodensha manga
2010s Japanese films